Grand-Fougeray is a commune in the Ille-et-Vilaine department of Brittany in north-western France.

Geography
The river Chère forms most of the commune's southern border.

Population
Inhabitants of Grand-Fougeray are called Fulkériens in French.

See also
Communes of the Ille-et-Vilaine department

References

External links

Mayors of Ille-et-Vilaine Association  

Communes of Ille-et-Vilaine